Ficus aripuanensis is a species of plant in the family Moraceae.

It is endemic to Mato Grosso and Pará states in Brazil.

References

Sources

aripuanensis
Endemic flora of Brazil
Flora of Pará
Environment of Mato Grosso
Trees of Brazil
Plants described in 1984
Endangered flora of South America
Taxonomy articles created by Polbot